Dearie is a surname.  Notable people with the surname include:

 Blossom Dearie (1924–2009), American jazz singer and pianist
 John Dearie, American novelist
 John C. Dearie (born 1940), American lawyer and politician
 Raymond J. Dearie (born 1944), United States judge

See also
 Deare